Moses Williams may refer to:

 Moses Williams (antiquarian) (1685-1742)
 Moses Williams (artist) (1777-c. 1825)
 Moses Williams (Medal of Honor) (1845-1899)